Power Plant and Dam No. 5, also known as Honeywood Dam, comprises a dam on the Potomac River, originally built for the Chesapeake and Ohio Canal, and a power plant built to take advantage of the river's flow to generate hydroelectric power. The dam is included in Chesapeake and Ohio Canal National Historical Park.

The dam was originally built to retain water for the C&O Canal in 1835. The 1835 dam was constructed of wood cribbing, and was attacked by Confederate forces under General Stonewall Jackson in December 1861 with the aim of destroying the dam, depriving the upper C&O Canal of water and consequently cutting off coal shipments to Washington, D.C. Two assaults by Jackson's forces failed to cause significant damage to the dam. The dam was later replaced with a stone structure, which has been upgraded with concrete.

The power plant is a two-story brick building on the West Virginia side of the river. It was built circa 1900 as the Honeywood paper mill. The first Honeywood Mill was built at the same time as the dam, in 1835 by Edward Colston.  It burned a few years later and was replaced, then burned in the Civil War. The power plant is operated by FirstEnergy with a total installed capacity of 1210 kilowatts.

The dam and power plant were placed on the National Register of Historic Places in 1980.

Little Slackwater

The water impounded by the dam made an area that the Canallers called "Little Slackwater". At Guard Lock #5, the canal entered the river, and the boats navigated in the slackwater for about a half a mile, returning to the canal at Lock 45. For the boatmen, this was a tricky place to steer, particularly if the current was fast. On 1 May 1903, a towline broke and the boat (with people aboard) went over the dam, causing injuries and loss of life.

See also 

 Power Plant and Dam No. 4

References

External links 

Stonewall Jackson's Attack on Dam No. 5

Energy infrastructure completed in 1900
American Civil War sites in West Virginia
Berkeley County, West Virginia, in the American Civil War
Buildings and structures in Berkeley County, West Virginia
Buildings and structures in Washington County, Maryland
Dams in West Virginia
Dams on the National Register of Historic Places in West Virginia
Hydroelectric power plants in West Virginia
Industrial buildings and structures on the National Register of Historic Places in West Virginia
National Register of Historic Places in Berkeley County, West Virginia
Potomac River
Historic American Engineering Record in West Virginia
FirstEnergy
Chesapeake and Ohio Canal
Energy infrastructure on the National Register of Historic Places